Mareike Ann Carrière (26 July 1954 – 17 March 2014) was a German actress, spokesperson and translator. She was perhaps best known for her television show appearances. She was born in Hanover, Lower Saxony, West Germany.

At the age of 16, she began her training at the Lübeck Drama School. After completing this, she caught up on her Abitur and studied English and French at the Sorbonne in Paris. She finished this study with a diploma as a translator. 

Carrière died from bladder cancer on 17 March 2014 in Hamburg, Germany. She was 59 years old.

Filmography
  (1978)
 Second Wind (1978)
  (1981, TV miniseries)
 The Confessions of Felix Krull (1982, TV miniseries)
 Yerma (1984)
 Abschied in Berlin (1985)
  (1985)
 Großstadtrevier (1986–1994, TV series)
 Praxis Bülowbogen (1987–1996, TV series)
  (1988, TV series)
 Fool's Mate (1989)
 The Dancing Girl (舞姫) (1989)
 The Rose Garden (1989)
 The Betrothed (1989, TV miniseries)
 L'avvocato delle donne (1997, TV miniseries)
 Die Schule am See (1997–2000, TV series)
 Was nicht passt, wird passend gemacht (2003–2007, TV series)
 The Call of the Toad (2005)
 Abendlied (2009)
 A Dangerous Method (2011)

References

External links

  
 

1954 births
2014 deaths
Deaths from cancer in Germany
Deaths from bladder cancer
German film actresses
German stage actresses
German television actresses
20th-century German actresses
21st-century German actresses
German people of French descent
Actors from Hanover
German radio personalities